Yevgeny Alekseevich Stychkin (born 10 June 1974) is a Russian actor and director known for his roles in God Loves Caviar and Trotsky.

Biography
Yevgeny Stychkin was born in Moscow. He graduated from the English special school No. 30. He studied at the All-Russian State University of Cinematography named after S. A. Gerasimov, course A. B. Dzhigarkhanyan and A. L. Filozov. From 1994 until 1995, actor of the Clownery Theater of Teresa Durova.

Starting from the year 1995, he is employed as an actor of the Moon Theater in Moscow. Played in the performances "Proposal" (School of modern plays, dir. I. Raihelgauz), "Fear and Misery of the Third Reich" (Theater "The Cherry Orchard", dir. A. Wilkin), "Mashenka" (Theatrical company of Sergey Vinogradov, dir. S. Vinogradov), "Charlie Cha" (Moon Theater, director, S. Prokhanov), "Seagull" Prize in the "Breakthrough-2000" nomination for the main role, "Faust" (Moon Theater, dir. F. Goifman) and others.

At the moment he cooperates with the theatrical company S. Vinogradov, the Mossovet Theatre, the Theater "School of Modern Play", the State Academic Theater named after Evgeny Vakhtangov.

In 2017 Stychkin was included in the blacklist of Myrotvorets.

In 2021 Stychkin directed television series Contact starring Pavel Maykov. It is his directorial debut.

Personal life
Stychkin's mother is actress and ballet dancer Kseniya Ryabinkina, a former soloist of the Bolshoi Theater.

Yevgeny was married to pianist Ekaterina Skanavi until the year 2009. Has four children; sons Aleksey Stychkin and Lev Stychkin, daughter Aleksandra, illegitimate daughter Sonya (1995). Evgeny Stychkin's current wife is actress Olga Sutulova.

Selected filmography

Film
Election Day (2007)
Attack on Leningrad (2009)
Alice's Birthday (2009, voice)
Burnt by the Sun 2 (2010)
God Loves Caviar (2012)
Locust (2015)
Collector (2016, voice)
Friday (2016)
Gogol. The Beginning (2017)
Maximum Impact (2017)
Beyond the Edge (2018)
Gogol. Viy (2018)
Gogol. Terrible Revenge (2018)

TV
The First Circle (2006)
Bunker, or Scientists Underground (2006)
The White Guard (2012)
The Dark Side of the Moon (2012)
Chernobyl: Zone of Exclusion (2014, 2017)
Locust (2016)
The Road to Calvary (2017)
Trotsky (2017)
Gogol (2019)
Just Imagine Things We Know (2020)

References

External links
 

1974 births
Living people
Russian male film actors
Russian male television actors
Russian male stage actors
20th-century Russian male actors
21st-century Russian male actors
Male actors from Moscow
Gerasimov Institute of Cinematography alumni
Russian film directors